William Augustus Adam (27 May 1865 – 18 October 1940) was a British Army officer and Conservative Party politician.

He was born with the surname "Adams" but later changed his name.

Biography 
Adam was educated at Harrow School, the University of Dublin, and Royal Military Academy, Sandhurst. Adam was a member of the 5th Royal Irish Lancers of the British Army, and fought in the Second Boer War and First World War, and reached the rank of major. He fought on the Japanese side in the Russo-Japanese War.

In 1906, the Army Council decided that Major Adam should be made to retire, owing to his unsuitability as a cavalry leader. Those events would later give rise to the litigation in Adam v Ward.

He was elected as Member of Parliament (MP) for Woolwich in the January 1910 general election, but was defeated in the second election that year.

References

External links
 brief biography at thePeerage.com
 

1865 births
1940 deaths
Conservative Party (UK) MPs for English constituencies
British Army personnel of the Second Boer War
British Army personnel of World War I
People educated at Harrow School
Graduates of the Royal Military College, Sandhurst
5th Royal Irish Lancers officers
Members of the Inner Temple
UK MPs 1910
People of the Russo-Japanese War